WSMI-FM 106.1 FM is a radio station broadcasting a country music format. Licensed to Litchfield, Illinois, the station is owned by Talley Broadcasting Corporation. WSMI-FM has separate programming from WSMI (AM).

References

External links
WSMI's official website

Country radio stations in the United States
SMI-FM